Sajid Island is one of the Farasan Islands in Saudi Arabia, located in the Red Sea near . Its area is 156.0 km2 and shoreline is 82.7 km.

References 
 United Nations Island Directory Home Page 
 Alwelaie, A. N., Chaudary S. A., and Alwetaid Y., "Vegetation of some Red Sea Islands of the Kingdom of Saudi Arabia", Journal of arid environments, 1993, vol. 24, no. 3, pp. 287–296.  ISSN 0140-1963.

Islands of the Red Sea
Islands of Saudi Arabia